This is a list of women artists who were born in New Zealand or whose artworks are closely associated with that country.



A

B

C

D

E

F

G

H

J

K

L

M

N

O

P

R

S

T

U

V

W

Y

Z

See also
 List of New Zealand artists
 List of New Zealand women photographers

-
New Zealand women artists, List of
Artists, List of New Zealand
Artists